The Frankfurt Cup was a men's tennis tournament played in Frankfurt, West Germany from 1987-1989.  The event was part of the Grand Prix tennis circuit and was held on indoor carpet courts.

Past finals

Singles

Doubles

References
 ATP Vault

External links

Grand Prix tennis circuit
Carpet court tennis tournaments
Indoor tennis tournaments
Defunct tennis tournaments in Germany
Sports competitions in Frankfurt
1989 disestablishments in West Germany